Kerstin Kristiansson Karlstedt (born 1948) is a Swedish social democratic politician. She was a member of the Riksdag from 1996 to 2006.

External links
Kerstin Kristiansson Karlsted at the Riksdag website

Members of the Riksdag from the Social Democrats
Living people
1948 births
Women members of the Riksdag
Members of the Riksdag 2002–2006
21st-century Swedish women politicians
Members of the Riksdag 1994–1998
Members of the Riksdag 1998–2002